The Hits Of Baccara is a compilation album by Spanish duo Baccara released on RCA-Victor in late 1978. This the first international Baccara hits collection yielded one new single release, double A-side "The Devil Sent You To Lorado"/"Somewhere In Paradise", and also contained their three biggest hits at the time, "Yes Sir I Can Boogie", "Sorry I'm A Lady" and "Darling", but omitted their 1978 Eurovision Song Contest entry "Parlez-Vous Français?".

The Hits Of Baccara was launched with a lavish gatefold sleeve picturing the duo visiting Japan and performing at the 1977 World Popular Song Festival held in Tokyo. In 1990 The Hits Of Baccara was to be re-released on compact disc provided with a new title and altered album art, as The Original Hits. The album was also issued in Spain as  LOS EXITOS DE BACCARA With a laminated G/F cover.

Track listing

Side A
 "The Devil Sent You to Lorado"  (Dostal - Soja)  - 4:07
 "Koochie-Koo"  (Dostal - Soja)  - 4:04
 "Adelita"  (Traditional)  - 2:31
 "Sorry, I'm a Lady"  (Dostal - Soja)  - 3:39
 "Cara Mia"  (Docker - Soja)  - 2:59
 "Granada"  (Lara)  - 4:21

Side B
 "Baby, Why Don't You Reach Out?" / "Light My Fire"  (Edit) (Soja - Dostal) / (Densmore - Krieger -  Manzarek - Morrison)  - 4:46
 "Somewhere in Paradise"  (Soja - Zentner)  - 4:12
 "La Bamba"  (Traditional)  - 3:04
 "Darling"  (7" Version) (Dostal - Soja)  - 5:28
 "Yes Sir, I Can Boogie"  (Dostal - Soja)  - 4:33

Personnel
 Mayte Mateos - vocals
 María Mendiola - vocals

Production
 Produced and arranged by Rolf Soja.

Track annotations
 Tracks A1 & B2 previously unreleased.
 Tracks A2, A4, A5, A6 & B5 from 1977 studio album Baccara.
 Tracks A3 & B3 from 1978 studio album Light My Fire.
 Track B1 edited version. Full-length version appears on album Light My Fire.
 Track B4 from 1978 7" single "Darling". Full-length version appears on album Light My Fire.

Baccara albums
1978 greatest hits albums
RCA Records compilation albums